Sidney Enrique Faiffer Ames (born 12 May 1980 in Lima) is a Peruvian footballer who plays as an attacking midfielder for Pirata in the Peruvian Segunda División.

Club career
Faiffer made his debut in the Torneo Descentralizado in the 2003 season playing for Deportivo Wanka.

On 4 April 2020, 39-year old Faiffer joined Peruvian Segunda División club Pirata FC.

References

External links

1980 births
Living people
Footballers from Lima
Association football midfielders
Peruvian footballers
Peru international footballers
U América F.C. footballers
Club Deportivo Wanka footballers
Alianza Atlético footballers
Club Alianza Lima footballers
Club Deportivo Universidad César Vallejo footballers
León de Huánuco footballers
Unión Comercio footballers
Cienciano footballers
Sport Huancayo footballers
Sport Boys footballers
Ayacucho FC footballers
Peruvian Primera División players
Peruvian Segunda División players